Shades of Black is the debut EP by recording artist Solomon, released on August 11, 2009.

Background
After releasing two hip-hop mixtapes, Solomon began working on the third mixtape. During the creation he began instead playing with more pop sounds. He has stated, "I'm actually in the studio right now working on my new EP. It's a five track EP titled, "Shades of Black".  I started more as a full on rapper, releasing mixtapes, doing remixes and stuff. I was featured on Eminem's Shade45 Sirius Radio, did the whole XXL, hip hop magazines and stuff and next thing you know I was thrown into this category that didn't fully reflect me."

Promotion
Along with the release, a remix for "Break My Heart" without gay rapper, Bry'Nt was released as a free bonus track.

Track listing

References

2009 debut EPs
Hip hop EPs